Sir Nicholas Pelham (1650 – 8 November 1739) was a British politician.

The third son of Sir Thomas Pelham, 2nd Baronet (but the first by Thomas' third wife Margaret), Pelham was educated at Christ Church, Oxford.

Pelham was knighted on 20 April 1661, and served in several post-Restoration Parliaments for Seaford and Sussex, and then in Lewes from 1702 to 1705. He married Jane Huxley, daughter of James Huxley of Dornford, by whom he had two sons and one daughter:
 Thomas Pelham (c.1678–1759)
 James Pelham (c.1683–1761)
 Margaret Pelham, married Sir William Ashburnham, 2nd Baronet

In 1726, his great-nephew, the Duke of Newcastle, brought him back into Parliament at Lewes, at the by-election that ensued after the death of another of Nicholas's great-nephews, Henry Pelham; Henry's brother Thomas had declined to take the seat until after he returned from Constantinople. However, Thomas was again in England by the next general election in 1727, and Sir Nicholas stood down in his favour. Sir Nicholas died at an advanced age in 1739.

References
 

1650s births
1739 deaths
Alumni of Christ Church, Oxford
British MPs 1722–1727
Knights Bachelor
Members of the Parliament of Great Britain for English constituencies
Whig (British political party) MPs for English constituencies
Younger sons of baronets
English MPs 1661–1679
English MPs 1680–1681
English MPs 1689–1690
English MPs 1702–1705
Nicholas